The Panofsky Prize in Experimental Particle Physics is an annual prize of the American Physical Society. It is given to recognize and encourage outstanding achievements in experimental particle physics, and is open to scientists of any nation. It was established in 1985 by friends of Wolfgang K. H. Panofsky and by the Division of Particles and Fields of the American Physical Society. Panofsky was a physics professor at Stanford University and the first director of the Stanford Linear Accelerator Center (SLAC). Several of the prize winners have subsequently won the Nobel Prize in Physics. As of 2021, the prize included a $10,000 award.

Recipients
The names, citations, and short biographies for Panofsky Prize winners are posted by the American Physical Society.

2022: Byron G. Lundberg, Kimio Niwa, Regina Abby Rameika, Vittorio Paolone
2021:  Edward Kearns, 
2020:  Wesley Smith
2019:  Sheldon Leslie Stone
2018:  Lawrence Sulak
2017:  Tejinder Virdee, Michel Della Negra, Peter Jenni
2016:  David Hitlin, Jonathan Dorfan, 
2015:  Stanley Wojcicki
2014:  Kam-Biu Luk, Wang Yifang
2013:  Blas Cabrera Navarro, Bernard Sadoulet
2012:  
2010:  Eugene Beier
2009:  , 
2008:  , Pierre Sokolsky 
2007:	Bruce Winstein, 
2006:	, Nigel Lockyer, 
2005:	Piermaria J. Oddone
2004:	Arie Bodek
2003:	William J. Willis
2002:	Masatoshi Koshiba, Takaaki Kajita, Yoji Totsuka
2001:	Paul Grannis
2000:	Martin Breidenbach
1999:	
1998:	David Robert Nygren
1997:	, 
1996:	Gail G. Hanson, Roy Frederick Schwitters
1995:	Frank J. Sciulli
1994:	, 
1993:	, Nicholas P. Samios, 
1992:	Raymond Davis, Jr. and Frederick Reines
1991:	Gerson Goldhaber  and 
1990:	Michael S. Witherell
1989:	Henry W. Kendall, Richard E. Taylor,  Jerome I. Friedman
1988:	Charles Y. Prescott

See also

 List of physics awards

References

External links
W.K.H. Panofsky Prize in Experimental Particle Physics

Awards of the American Physical Society
Fellows of the American Physical Society